Fautino De Los Santos (born February 15, 1986) is a Dominican former professional baseball relief pitcher. He played in Major League Baseball for the Oakland Athletics in 2011 and 2012 and he played for the Musashi Heat Bears in Japan's Baseball Challenge League.

Professional career

Chicago White Sox (2006–2008)
De Los Santos began his career in the Chicago White Sox organization as a starting pitcher. He played well in the Dominican Summer League in 2006. In 2007, he split time between Single-A Kannapolis and Advanced-A Winston-Salem.

Oakland Athletics (2008–2012)
In January 2008, he was traded along with Ryan Sweeney and Gio González to the Athletics for Nick Swisher. In 2008, he pitched for Single-A Stockton, but was out for much of the 2008 and 2009 seasons after undergoing Tommy John surgery to repair an injured elbow. He finished 2009 with the AZL Athletics and was added to the Athletics' 40-man roster after the season ended. De Los Santos began 2010 back with the Stockton Ports and was promoted to the Double-A Midland RockHounds where he spent most of the season. Despite finishing 2010 with a disappointing 6.54 ERA in 25 appearances with Midland, De Los Santos performed well in 2011 and quickly climbed the ranks. He was promoted to the Triple-A Sacramento River Cats on May 5.

On May 20, after just 6 innings pitched in 5 appearances in Triple-A, De Los Santos received his first major-league call-up to the Athletics when Brandon McCarthy and Tyson Ross were placed on the disabled list. However, since both injured pitchers were in the team's starting rotation, De Los Santos was sent back down again four days later without having made an appearance to make room for the promotion of a starter, Guillermo Moscoso. On June 3, De Los Santos was again called up to the Athletics when Grant Balfour, another reliever, was placed on paternity leave. In his major-league debut on June 4, De Los Santos faced one batter, the Red Sox's Jed Lowrie, and struck him out. In his second appearance, though, De Los Santos gave up a hit and then two wild pitches in the same at bat, allowing a run in one inning. In an unexpected move, the Athletics decided to keep De Los Santos with the team when Balfour returned from leave, because their bullpen had been depleted in the previous night's 14-inning game, designating backup infielder Andy LaRoche for assignment instead.

Milwaukee Brewers (2012)
On July 28, 2012, De Los Santos was traded to the Milwaukee Brewers for catcher George Kottaras.

San Diego Padres (2013)
On February 6, 2013, De Los Santos was claimed off waivers by the San Diego Padres. Later that year, he was one of 20 players named in connection to Biogenesis of America, who allegedly gave performance-enhancing drugs to professional players. On August 5, 2013, he agreed to a 50-game suspension for his role in the scandal while in Arizona recovering from right shoulder surgery.

Diablos Rojos del México (2018)
On July 2, 2018, De Los Santos signed with the Diablos Rojos del México of the Mexican League. He was released on August 14, 2018.

References

External links

1986 births
Living people
Arizona League Athletics players
Diablos Rojos del México players
Dominican Republic expatriate baseball players in Japan
Dominican Republic expatriate baseball players in Mexico
Dominican Republic expatriate baseball players in the United States
Dominican Republic sportspeople in doping cases
Kannapolis Intimidators players
Major League Baseball pitchers
Major League Baseball players from the Dominican Republic
Major League Baseball players suspended for drug offenses
Mexican League baseball pitchers
Midland RockHounds players
Nashville Sounds players
Oakland Athletics players
Sacramento River Cats players
Stockton Ports players
Tucson Padres players
Winston-Salem Warthogs players